Domnești is a commune in the southwestern part of Ilfov County, Muntenia, Romania. Its name is derived from "Domn" (Lord, referring to the ruler of Wallachia) and suffix "-ești". It is composed of two villages, Domnești and Țegheș.

References

Communes in Ilfov County
Localities in Muntenia